John Leo Dowd (born John Leo O'Dowd from January 3, 1891 to January 31, 1981) was a Major League Baseball shortstop. In 10 career games, he had a .194 batting average, with six hits in 31 at-bats. He batted and threw right-handed.

Dowd was born in Weymouth, Massachusetts and died in Fort Lauderdale, Florida.

External links
Baseball Reference.com page

1891 births
1981 deaths
New York Highlanders players
Major League Baseball shortstops
Vermont Catamounts baseball players
Baseball players from Massachusetts
Brockton Shoemakers players
Topeka Jayhawks players
New London Planters players
Waterbury Nattatucks players
Waterbury Brasscos players